The tree martin (Petrochelidon nigricans) is a member of the swallow family of passerine birds. It breeds in Australia, mostly south of latitude 20°S and on Timor island. It is migratory, wintering through most of Australia, New Guinea, Indonesia east of the Wallace Line and the Solomon Islands. It is a vagrant to New Zealand, where it has bred, and New Caledonia. This species is frequently placed in the genus Hirundo  as Hirundo nigricans.

This is a bird of open woodland, preferably with large trees to provide nest holes. It is increasingly common in urban and suburban areas.

Description
The tree martin averages 13 cm long and has a shallowly forked tail. The adult has an iridescent blue back and crown, brown wings and tail, a rufous forehead and a whitish rump. The underparts are white. The sexes are similar, but young birds are duller and browner, with a paler forehead and pale fringes to the back and wing feathers.

The call of this vocal swallow is a tsweet and the song is a high-pitched twitter.

This species can be distinguished from other Australian swallows by its tail shape and pale rump. The most similar species, the fairy martin, has a rufous head and nape

The tree martin has three subspecies:
P. n. nigricans, the largest subspecies, breeds in eastern Australia, except northern Queensland, and is the form that has bred in New Zealand.
P. n. neglecta  breeds in western and northern Australia. It is slightly smaller than nominate nigricans at 11–12 cm length.
P. n. timoriensis, the smallest subspecies, breeds mainly in Timor.  It has dark streaks on the throat and neck.

Behaviour
Tree martins breed, depending on region, from July through to January, either in pairs or semi-colonially depending on nest site availability. Nests are constructed in natural holes in dead trees or rock crevices, but increasingly in artificial sites on bridges and buildings. This is most common in western Australia, where breeding occurs even in large cities like Adelaide and Perth. Tree martins also occasionally reline the nests of welcome swallows, and may displace the owners to obtain the nest.

The nest, unusually for a cliff swallow, is often made just from grass and leaves, but may be reinforced with mud. A mud and plant fibre cement is also used to reduce the width of the entrance to the breeding hole. The clutch is 3–5, usually four, brown and mauve-spotted white eggs, and this species is often double-brooded.

Tree martins have a fast twisting flight and feed higher than welcome swallows, often more than 6 m above the ground. They are frequently seen above the canopy of tall eucalyptus trees catching aerial insects,  but will also feed on insect swarms low over water. This species can be highly gregarious when not breeding, and will form mixed flocks with fairy martins.

Gallery

References 

Birds of Perth

tree martin
Birds of Australia
Birds of Timor
tree martin
Taxa named by Louis Jean Pierre Vieillot